Hoploseius is a genus of mites in the family Ascidae.

Species
 Hoploseius andamanensis Bhattacharyya, 2002      
 Hoploseius australianus Walter, 1998      
 Hoploseius cometa (Berlese, 1910)      
 Hoploseius mariae Gwiazdowicz, 2002      
 Hoploseius sitalaensis Bhattacharyya, 1977

References

Ascidae